Angel Ortiz (born 1967), known publicly as LA II or LA2 (meaning "Little Angel"), is an American graffiti artist and visual artist of Puerto Rican descent from the Lower East Side who is known for his collaborations with Keith Haring. Ortiz's contributions to Haring's work, including his trademark graffiti infill squiggles, have notably been obscured by the art establishment, which has prompted Ortiz's supporters, including artist, photographer, and videographer Clayton Patterson, to publicly uplift Ortiz's work and ask for credit to be given. Ortiz is represented by Lawrence Fine Art, which has galleries in Los Angeles and East Hampton. Angel Ortiz is exclusively represented by D'Stassi Art in the UK.

Life and career 
Ortiz has created graffiti art since at the age of ten. Starting in the mid-1970s, he tagged in New York's Lower East Side under the moniker LA2. At the age of thirteen, his subway tags caught the attention of Keith Haring in 1980. Haring was reportedly inspired by Ortiz's artistry and the two began collaborating. At the age of sixteen, Ortiz was in contact with Basquiat and Andy Warhol. In 1982, Ortiz and Haring collaborated for an exhibition at the Tony Shafrazi Gallery in New York.

In a 1992 biography on Haring's life, Haring stated "We just immediately hit it off. It's as if we'd known each other all our lives. He's like my little brother." Kenny Scharf, artist and friend of Haring's, recalled "Keith treated him as a true collaborator; he didn't treat him like some little kid, which he actually was, really. He respected him and gave him half of whatever they collaborated on." Ortiz confirmed that he was paid for his work during Haring's lifetime. However, Ortiz stopped receiving payment from Haring's estate following his death. According to scholar Ricardo Montez, the Haring Foundation has "since made strides to rectify LA2's erasure."

Although his collaborator Haring began to be shown in galleries, Ortiz did not receive comparable success. By the early 1990s, Ortiz's contributions were largely forgotten and ignored. He became addicted to heroin and served eight months in prison for possession. Between 1987 and 2002 Ortiz was arrested at least nine times. In 2003, he was arrested for marijuana possession.

In 2008, Ortiz and Clayton Patterson added black lines to a Haring mural that was re-created at the intersection of Houston and Bowery streets in order to draw attention to the erasure that Ortiz has faced from Haring's artistic career. Ortiz stated, "when I was painting that mural, I didn't feel like it was me, I felt like it was Keith's spirit in me [...] I don't want to be rich and famous. What keeps me going is my art. I wanted to show the foundation: This is LA II, this is how it all started." In an interview, Ortiz relayed to The New York Sun that "the executive director of the Haring Foundation, Julia Gruen, [has] repeatedly asked him to help authenticate Haring works in preparation for sale at auction houses such as Sotheby's while refusing his request for recognition by the foundation."

In 2011, Ortiz was arrested three times in short succession for tagging his famed LA II and LA ROC monikers throughout the Lower East Side. Ortiz stated his graffiti spree came as a result of his wife's death, who had died earlier that year in January after a liver transplant: "I used the street as a canvas to express myself. It's an emotional thing that I'm still going through." Ortiz was arrested for a third time right before the opening of his show at Dorian Grey Gallery and the show suffered as a result. At the time of his arrest, Ortiz stated "I shouldn't have done it. I knew sooner or later I was going to get arrested." Friend Ramona Lugo stated, "You know how many times I had arguments with him because he was going to do graffiti? He knew not to do that, [but] he's still got that mentality. That is the mentality of the graffiti artist." Ortiz was sentenced to prison at Rikers Island for 45 days for the tagging. Hearing of the sentence, Lugo added "I'm heartbroken for him because I know he's hurting. He's going though hell in there. He doesn't belong in there. He's a good person." After his release, Ortiz stated "I went there for graffiti and got transformed into a gladiator. They got all the gangs in there: the Bloods, the Latin Kings." Ortiz stated that the jail time gave him an opportunity to reflect and gave him new inspiration.

In 2020, Clayton Patterson described Ortiz as follows:LA2's struggle and history make him important to me. He was a young Puerto Rican kid who came to me for help. He had joined the Keith Haring circus at 15. Keith had the barking dog and the radiant baby. But it's graphics, not fine art. LA2 created the fill-ins. Those little symbols in Keith's work are LA2's signatures. Keith and LA2 were a collaboration, and people don't talk about their work that way. LA2 was not just the help. The art establishment has shafted him.Patterson credited the erasure of Ortiz to racism in the art world.

Key exhibitions 
On September 30, 2022, Ortiz had his debut solo show with D'Stassi Art Gallery in Shoreditch, London. Angel created over 30 new large-scale paintings for the show – his first in the UK in over 40 years.

American graffiti artists
Artists from New York City
People from the Lower East Side
Living people
1967 births
Hispanic and Latino American artists